Milly & Mamet: Ini Bukan Cinta & Rangga is a 2018 Indonesian romantic comedy film directed by Ernest Prakasa. It is a spin-off of the 2002 movie Ada Apa Dengan Cinta?. Aside from being a director, Prakasa also acts as a screenwriter and performer.

This film was produced by 2 reliable Indonesian production companies, namely Starvision and Miles Films as the owner of Ada Apa Dengan Cinta? (2002). The two of them worked together to form a spin off from the story Ada Apa Dengan Cinta?, where the story focused on how Milly and Mamet built their household family.

Synopsis 
Continuing the Ada Apa Dengan Cinta? 2 story timeline, now Milly (Sissy Priscillia) and Mamet (Dennis Adhiswara) are preoccupied with taking care of their babies. Mamet who has a passion for cooking and worked as a chef now works at Papa Milly's factory. A rather forced choice, because now he became the foundation of their small family after Milly resigned from his profession as a banker to focus on raising children. Until one day, Mamet met Alexandra (Julie Estelle), a close friend in college. With enthusiasm, Alexandra told me that she had gotten an investor to finance the idea of a restaurant that they had once imagined together. With the relationship between Mamet and Milly's Dad worsening, will Mamet accept this offer and pursue his dream? And how did Milly adapt to her new life as a full-time mom?

Cast 
 Sissy Priscillia as Milly
 Dennis Adhiswara as a Mamet
 Julie Estelle as Alexandra
 Yoshi Sudarso as James
 Dian Sastrowardoyo as Cinta
 Adinia Wirasti as Karmen
 Titi Kamal as Maura
 Ardit Erwandha as Robby
 Arafah Rianti as Sari / Milly's Assistant
 Roy Marten as Mr. Sony
 Ernest Prakasa as Yongki
 Isyana Sarasvati as Rika
 Eva Celia as Jojo
 Melly Goeslaw as Mamah Itje
 Aci Resti as IIN
 Dinda Kanyadewi as Lela
 Bintang Emon as Somat
 Tike Priatnakusumah as Bi Sum
 Muhadkly Acho as Hendra
 Surya Saputra as Rama
 Gebi Ramadhan as a seller of fried rice (Cameo)

Music 
 Sissy Priscillia – Kita
 Jaz – Berdua Bersama
 Jaz – Luluh
 Isyana Sarasvati Feat. Rara Sekar – Luruh
 Isyana Sarasvati – Stargazing

References

External links 
 

2018 romantic comedy films
2018 films
Indonesian romantic comedy films